The Beijing Marathon is an annual marathon race held around October in Beijing, People's Republic of China, since 1981. The race begins at Tiananmen Square and finishes in Celebration Square in Olympic Green.  The full marathon is the only distance offered.

The marathon is categorized as a Gold Label Road Race by World Athletics.  The course is certified by AIMS.

Beijing Marathon is the first international sport event ever to be held in China. The race is also the first marathon race to use lottery system to allocate entries and the first full marathon race only in China.

History 
The Beijing International Marathon has been organized by the Chinese Athletics Association annually since 1981. The creation of the race, which was international in nature from its inception, was part of a wider movement to open up China and its culture to foreign innovations – a change which was led by Deng Xiaoping, who sought to move China away from its Maoist past.

In 1997, the marathon hosted the Chinese men's national marathon championships, with the title going to race winner Hu Gangjun, who had won in Beijing two times previously.

The 2005 race served as the marathon for the 2005 National Games of China – Sun Yingjie took the Games gold medal for women while seventh placed Zhang Qingle (18 years old at the time) was the highest placing Chinese man and won the men's Games gold.

Also in 2005, the men's race winner Benson Kipchumba Cherono missed some 800 metres out of the course due to being misdirected. The race organisers accepted the blame for the mishap and, although James Moiben was the first to finish the complete course (2:12:15), Cherono was declared the official winner as he held a large leading margin before the incident.

The marathon hosted the Asian Marathon Championship races in 2006.

At the 2009 edition of the race, 4897 runners finished the marathon course, which included 556 women.

The 2014 edition of Beijing International Marathon was held on October 19 under intense smog. Many marathoners used face masks and sponges to help their performance.

The 2020 edition of the race was cancelled due to the coronavirus pandemic.

In 2021, although participation was initially restricted to permanent residents of Beijing and invited domestic elite athletes, and strict coronavirus protocols were put in place, the marathon was postponed days before the scheduled date of  due to an outbreak of the Delta variant of the virus.  The postponement closely followed an earlier postponement of the Wuhan Marathon days before its scheduled date. 

The 2022 edition finally took place in November 6, and got around 30,000 runners, becoming first Beijing Marathon since 2019 after Covid cancelled previous races.

2012 Japanese entrants 
When the online registration of runners for the 2012 event started on November 8, 2012, it did so without the option for Japanese to do so. The events organizers said that Japanese couldn't enter this year because of "safety concerns" due to tension between Japan and China over the Senkaku Islands dispute. The Japanese embassy protested the decision.

This move attracted a large amount of criticism and on the night of November 10 the option for Japanese runners re-appeared, although there was no Japanese-language version available, which had been available the previous year.

The Chinese Athletic Association subsequently claimed that Japanese runners had never been rejected. CAA Deputy Director Shen Chunde said that in the past Japanese athletes had mainly applied through Japanese organizations so no individual registration was available.

Course record 

In 1986 Taisuke Kodama of Japan set a men's course record in a time of 2:07:35. Ethiopian runner Abebe Mekonnen equaled this time in 1988 and some commentators (including the Association of Road Racing Statisticians) regard this as the true course record, in respect of reports that the 1986 course was around 400 m short of the marathon distance.

After 27 years unbeaten, Taisuke Kodama's course record was improved by Tadese Tola in 2013 as the Ethiopian beat the previous mark by nineteen seconds with 2:07:16 hours. In 2019 Mathew Kisorio improved the course record with a time of 2:07:06.

In 2003, Sun Yingjie of China set the current women's record of 2:19:38 – this run was an Asian record and the fourth fastest ever at the time, and it remains the Chinese record for the event.

Course 

The marathon starts in Tiananmen Square between the Mausoleum of Mao Zedong and the National Museum of China, and finishes in Celebration Square in the Olympic Green, slightly north of the Beijing National Stadium and the Beijing National Aquatics Center.

Winners 

  Course record (in bold)
  National championship race
  Asian Marathon Championship race

Notes

References

External links

 Official website
 All winners of the Beijing International Marathon on arrs.run
 Beijing Marathon Registration

Marathons in China
Athletics in Beijing
Recurring sporting events established in 1981
1981 establishments in China
Annual events in Beijing
Annual sporting events in China
Autumn events in China